Butler is a historic, unincorporated community in Freestone County, Texas. The community is southeast of Fairfield and about 14 miles outside city limits on U.S. Route 84.

Demographics
The community has a total population of approximately 1,475. Broken down, there seems to be an equal separation in gender representation with each group accounting for roughly 50% of the population.

Population in July 2007:
Males: 733 	 (49.7%),
Females: 742 	 (50.3%)

Racial Group Representation:
White alone - 760 (54.1%),
Black alone - 572 (40.7%),
Hispanic - 54 (3.8%),
Two or more races - 14 (1.0%),
American alone - 3 (0.2%),
Asian alone - 1 (0.07%)

The average household size is 2.4 people and roughly 57% of the community is a family household, which is well below the state average. Parts of the community are fairly poor with 15% of residents earning income below the poverty level.

Schools
Butler is served by the Fairfield Independent School District which includes Fairfield Elementary school, Fairfield Intermediate school, and Fairfield High School.

Students who wish to pursue higher education, have many options to choose from within reasonable travel distance. These options include Trinity Valley Community College (38 miles), Navarro College (42 miles), UT Tyler (63 miles), Texas State Technical College (67 miles), Tyler Junior College (69 miles), Sam Houston State University (70 miles), and Texas A&M (73 miles).

Landmarks
Because Butler is a very small, secluded community the residents find a lack of resources in their area. The nearest hospitals can be located in Fairfield, TX and Palestine, TX 14 miles and 21 miles away respectively.

The community is rich in history and geographical diversity. Notable sites in Butler include its many churches, historic cemeteries, lakes and reservoirs, as well as the numerous springs and creeks.

History
In the early 1850s, several prominent families from Butler County, Alabama, settled in area known a West Point Hill. Over time the settlement grew with the addition of a church in 1854 and the establishment of a post office in 1856. By 1858 the community had a doctor, a general store, several businesses, and a Masonic lodge. The major revenue of the town at that time was from cotton, which was shipped through Galveston by steamboat on the Trinity River. In 1872 the International-Great Northern Railroad attempted to build a line through the town, but an agreement with landowners could not be reached. The railroad instead went through Oakwood and Palestine. In 1880 the population of Butler was 300, but by 1892 it had decreased to 150, primarily due to the lack of a railroad and the decline in steamboat traffic. In 1916, the post office was closed and all mail was sent through the office in Oakwood. By 1969, all schools had been consolidated in Fairfield.

Sacred Harp composer Sarah Lancaster lived in Butler for some time with her family.

References

Unincorporated communities in Freestone County, Texas
Unincorporated communities in Texas